Shivamurthy Kasina Naik better known by name K. Shivamurthy is the Member of the Legislative Assembly of Mayakonda, Davanagere district Karnataka, India. He was elected in the year 2013, defeating N. Linganna and succeeding M. Basavaraja Naika.

References

1956 births
Living people
Indian National Congress politicians from Karnataka